is a song by South Korean girl group T-ara. The single was released on March 20, 2013 as their last release under EMI Music Japan.

Background and promotion
T-ara held special showcases in fifteen Japanese cities, starting in Sapporo on February 20 and Marioka on 21st. Other cities where they held showcases include Saitama, Kyoto, Fukuoka, Nagasaki etc. The showcase tour reportedly attracted 100,000 local fans.

Despite being sung by the K-Pop singers, the original cover is Japanese.

Critical reception
Billboard K-Town columnist Jeff Benjamin wrote that the song "incorporates a cuddly and cute theme over a techno club beat" with "aggressive synthesizers that recall Britney Spears' "3". He was critical, however, in saying that while "Banisuta!" brings T-ara's usual earworm hook, the song "fails to be nearly as catchy as singles like "Roly-Poly" or "Lovey-Dovey".

Track listing

Charts

Oricon chart

Showcase Tour

Overview 
The T-ara Bunny Style! Special Showcase Tour (T-ARA バニスタ! スペシャル ショーケース) was a tour in Japan by T-ara held to promote "Bunny Style!".  A special Fan Sign event was also run to got the most fans and signed the most autographs, the winner was tied between Boram, Eunjung, and Jiyeon. The tour had 14 showcases across 14 Japanese cities. Hyomin was not present for the showcase due to her filming Jinx!!! at the time.

Tour dates

Awards and nominations

Release history

References

2013 singles
T-ara songs
Japanese-language songs
2013 songs